Storfjord is a municipality in Troms og Finnmark county, Norway. The administrative centre of the municipality is the village of Hatteng. Other villages in Storfjord include Elvevoll, Oteren, and Skibotn.

The  municipality is the 54th largest by area out of the 356 municipalities in Norway. Storfjord is the 289th most populous municipality in Norway with a population of 1,836.

General information
The municipality of Storfjord was established in 1929 when the large Lyngen Municipality was divided into three: Lyngen Municipality in the northwest, Kåfjord Municipality in the northeast, and Storfjord Municipality in the south. The initial population of Storfjord was 1,499. On 1 January 1964, the Elvebakken farm of Balsfjord Municipality was transferred to Storfjord. Then on 1 January 1992, one uninhabited farm in the Nordnes area of Lyngen Municipality was transferred to Storfjord.

On 1 January 2020, the municipality became part of the newly formed Troms og Finnmark county. Previously, it had been part of the old Troms county.

Name
The municipality is named after the Storfjorden.

Coat of arms
The coat of arms was granted on 9 February 1990. The official blazon is "Gules, three poppies Or in pall". This means the arms have a red field (background) and the charge is three poppies of the very rare species Papaver laestadianum (a subspecies of Papaver radicatum). The poppies have a tincture of Or which means they are commonly colored yellow, but if it is made out of metal, then gold is used. The poppies are rotated around a meeting point which represents the meeting point (Treriksrøysa) of the three countries Norway, Sweden, and Finland, that lies on the edge of the municipality. The arms were designed by Arvid Sveen.

Churches
The Church of Norway has one parish within the municipality of Storfjord. It is part of the Nord-Troms prosti (deanery) in the Diocese of Nord-Hålogaland.

History

The Sami culture is the original culture; however, in the 19th century, settlers came from Finland and from the valleys of Southern Norway to establish themselves. Sami culture, though, has survived in parts of Storfjord to the present. In the 19th century, Laestadianism, a puritan religious movement, obtained a strong position. Skibotn is even today a stronghold for this movement.

The market of Skibotn was traditionally a meeting point between ethnic groups, where Sami, Finns, and Norwegians met to trade. This market still takes place today. The ethnic mix is interesting, with both Sami and Finnish cultures represented. In the valley of Signaldalen, a Norwegian dialect of southern origin is spoken, a relic of the valley's settlement from the south in the early 19th century.

World War Two
There were several prison camps there during World War Two.
A 2014 NRK article estimated that a total of around 7000 or 8000 Soviet prisoners,  were interred in these prison camps.
Furthermore, the Mallnitz Camp was the worst.

Government
All municipalities in Norway, including Storfjord, are responsible for primary education (through 10th grade), outpatient health services, senior citizen services, unemployment and other social services, zoning, economic development, and municipal roads. The municipality is governed by a municipal council of elected representatives, which in turn elect a mayor.  The municipality falls under the Nord-Troms District Court and the Hålogaland Court of Appeal.

Municipal council
The municipal council  of Storfjord is made up of 17 representatives that are elected to four year terms. The party breakdown of the council is as follows:

Mayors
The mayors of Storfjord:

1929–1934: Amund Flugum (V)
1934–1936: Nils Johan Tillnes (Ap)
1936–1937: Oskar Heiskel (Ap)
1937–1940: Hans Tillnes (Ap)
1940–1942: Amund Flugum (NS)
1942–1943: Isak Heiskel (NS)
1943–1945: Hans Ingebrigt Hansen (NS)
1945–1964: Fridtjov Olsborg (Ap)
1964–1978: Rasmus Engstad (Ap)
1979–1993: Idar Mikkelsen (Ap)
1993–2003: Hans Strandvoll (Ap)
2003-2011: Hanne Braathen (Sp)
2011-2015: Sigmund Steinnes (Ap)
2015-2019: Knut Jentoft (LL)
2019–present: Geir Varvik (H)

Geography
The municipality is situated around the inner parts of the Lyngen fjord. Storfjord borders both Finland and Sweden, and the borders of the three countries meet at the beacon of Treriksröset, the northernmost point of Sweden. Treriksrøysa is a popular hiking destination; there are no fences, so at this location one step forward is all that is needed to get from one country to another. Pine and birch forests are common in the valleys in Storfjord, and the more rare calcareous pine forests, with several orchids, are also present. The lake Rihpojávri is located near the eastern border of Storfjord.

Climate
This is due to the high mountains in the Lyngen Alps to the west, placing Skibotn valley in a rain shadow. Skibotn has fewest clouds in Norway, with on average 88 days/year with no clouds. The Norwegian Centre for Space Weather has an observatory in Skibotn. Precipitation is fairly even distributed over the year, although spring and early summer is drier than the rest of the year. The climate is classified as boreal, but with a complete lack of permafrost (except in the mountains).The all-time high temperature is  recorded July 2014; while August 2018 recorded . The all-time low is  recorded February 2012 (extremes since 2004). Skibotn recorded  10 November 2011, at that time the warmest November temperature recorded in Troms.

Notable people 
 Nils-Aslak Valkeapää (1943–2001) a Finnish Sami writer, musician and artist; lived in Skibotn
 Astrid Båhl (born 1959) a Norwegian Sámi artist; lived in Skibotn
 Sigmund Steinnes (1959–2018) a Norwegian politician; elected Mayor of Storfjord in 2011
 Bente Pedersen (born 1961 in Skibotn) a Norwegian novelist
 Marja Bål Nango (born 1988) a Norwegian Sami filmmaker, brought by Sami reindeer herders in Skibotn

Gallery

References

External links

Municipal fact sheet from Statistics Norway 

 
Municipalities of Troms og Finnmark
1929 establishments in Norway
Sámi-language municipalities